Universal Soldiers is a 2007 military science fiction film directed by Griff Furst and starring Kristen Quintrall, Dario Deak, Jason S. Gray, and starring Rick Malambri. It was distributed by The Asylum.

Plot 
The U.S. government initiates a program to create genetically-modified cybernetic super soldiers, but it goes awry when the test subjects escape from their holding cells. Set on an island in an undisclosed location. A team of Marine grunts is stalked by the genetically and physically superior experimental Universal Soldiers. The Universal Soldier characters, sometimes called ""UNISOL's"" (an acronym also used in the completely unrelated Universal Soldier series of films) are restricted and monitored by computerized metal masks that cover the left side of their faces. To act independently, the soldiers must rip the mask off, mutilating their faces. Most wear black jumpsuits with armor on their chests, shoulders and spines and display superhuman abilities. They can move fast enough to not be seen and jump so high and far that they appear to be flying, though they are not capable of true flight.

The Marine's try to survive the attacks by the Unisols, as well as each other's conflicting personalities and strategies. Much of the story centers around some characters who try to find an armory and establish a defense while the more scientifically minded characters instead try to find the bunker where their enemy is coming from. The total nature of the Universal Soldiers is never clearly explained and each is apparently slightly more advanced than the previous. At least two of them appear to be reanimated corpses or at least share a resemblance with modern "living dead" character's seen in horror genre movies. They have pasty bluish skin that seems wrinkled and possibly brittle. At least some of them may have a robotic metal endo-skeleton though this only suggested by the appearance of the final, most advanced "Unit", which is a 25 foot tall robotic skeleton. It is apparently incomplete and may be intended to have the same cover of human flesh that the smaller soldiers have since its unprotected metal structure is vulnerable to missile attack and electricity.

Cast

See also 
 Universal Soldier - a 1992 science fiction film directed by Roland Emmerich
 R.O.T.O.R. - a 1989 low-budget science fiction film.

References

External links 
 Universal Soldiers at The Asylum
 

2007 independent films
2007 films
2007 science fiction films
2007 direct-to-video films
American science fiction films
The Asylum films
Films shot in Los Angeles
Military science fiction films
Films directed by Griff Furst
2000s English-language films
2000s American films